The 1973–74 FIBA Women's European Cup Winners' Cup was the third edition of FIBA Europe's second-tier competition for women's basketball clubs, running between 6 November 1973 and 10 April 1974. Defending champion Spartak Leningrad defeated Geas Basket in the final to win its third title in a row.

First qualifying round

Second qualifying round

Group stage

Group A

Group B

Semifinals

Final

References

1973-74
1973–74 in European women's basketball